Jill is a feminine given name.

Jill may also refer to:

 Jill (cat), a cat on Blue Peter
 Jill (novel), a novel by Philip Larkin
 Jill (TV program), a Dutch television program hosted by Jill Schirnhofer
 Nakajima B6N, a Japanese torpedo bomber of World War II
 Jill or jillstrap, a piece of protective equipment
 A female ferret
 Buffalo Jills, a cheerleading squad 
 Jill, one of the Clayton Windmills, at Clayton, Sussex

See also
 Jil (disambiguation)